East Worcester is a hamlet and census-designated place (CDP) in the town of Worcester in Otsego County, New York, United States. It was first listed as a CDP prior to the 2020 census.

East Worcester is in eastern Otsego County, in the northeast part of the town of Worcester. It is bordered to the north by the town of Decatur and to the southeast by Interstate 88. New York State Route 7 is East Worcester's Main Street. Access to I-88 is either from Exit 19 in Worcester hamlet,  to the southwest along Route 7, or from Exit 20 in Richmondville,  to the east, also via Route 7.

East Worcester is in the valley of Schenevus Creek where it is joined from the north by Oak Creek. I-88 and State Route 7 follow the creek valley for its entire distance.

Demographics

References 

Census-designated places in Otsego County, New York
Census-designated places in New York (state)